Hans Simonsson (born 1 May 1962) is a retired professional tennis player from Sweden. Primarily a doubles specialist, he won 11 ATP Tour titles in his career. He won the French Open doubles title in 1983 with his countryman Anders Järryd. He also played in the 1983 Davis Cup final for Sweden. He reached his career high doubles ranking of No. 10 in the world on 2 January 1984. Simonsson again reached the French Open doubles final in 1985, but he and Schlomo Glickstein were defeated by Mark Edmondson and Kim Warwick. The Swede finished his career prematurely at the age of 25.

He is a brother of fellow tennis player Stefan Simonsson.

Grand Slam finals

Doubles (1 title, 1 runner-up)

Career finals

Doubles (11 titles, 7 runner-ups)

References

External links

1962 births
Living people
Swedish male tennis players
Grand Slam (tennis) champions in men's doubles
French Open champions
20th-century Swedish people